The Henry's Pub hostage incident was a hostage crisis that occurred on September 28, 1990, at Henry's Pub inside the Hotel Durant in Berkeley, California, United States. Mehrdad Dashti, who had schizophrenia, held 33 hostages for seven hours, terrorizing them and sexually degrading some of them. Dashti and a hostage were killed when police entered the premises.

Incident
At about 12:30 am, Iranian-born 29-year-old Mehrdad Dashti brought with him 445 rounds of ammunition, and three guns and held 33 hostages for 7 hours in the bar near the University of California, Berkeley. During the incident the hostage-taker issued irrational, delusional demands to the police officers, such as asking for trillions of dollars from the federal government in exchange for telepathy services or insisting that San Francisco Police Chief Frank Jordan make a statement, appear on television and drop his pants. He ordered some blonde female students to undress below the waist and spoke sexually demeaning language to them. 

By 7 am, police negotiators had unsuccessfully tried to disarm Dashti and decided to move in. In the siege a student was killed, John N. Sheehy (22), shot in the chest at close range, and six other students and one police officer were wounded by gunfire. Then the gunman was shot and killed with a hail of bullets to his head and chest.

References

Killings by law enforcement officers in the United States
Hostage taking in the United States
Crimes in the San Francisco Bay Area
1990 in California
20th century in Berkeley, California
Deaths by firearm in California
1990 crimes in the United States
September 1990 crimes
1990 mass shootings in the United States
Mass shootings in California